Neocollyris grandisubtilis is a species of ground beetle in the genus Neocollyris in the family Carabidae. It was described by Horn in 1935.

References

Grandisubtilis, Neocollyris
Beetles described in 1935